Bruno Moreira Soares (born 8 April 1999), commonly known as Bruno, is a Brazilian professional footballer who plays as a winger for Super League Greece 2 club Niki Volos.

Career statistics

Club

Notes

References

External links

 Bruno Moreira at Soccerway

1999 births
Living people
Brazilian footballers
Brazilian expatriate footballers
Association football midfielders
Santos FC players
Envigado F.C. players
Ansan Greeners FC players
Chungnam Asan FC players
Persebaya Surabaya players
Niki Volos F.C. players
Categoría Primera A players
K League 2 players
Liga 1 (Indonesia) players
Super League Greece 2 players
Brazilian expatriate sportspeople in Colombia
Expatriate footballers in Colombia
Brazilian expatriate sportspeople in South Korea
Expatriate footballers in South Korea
Brazilian expatriate sportspeople in Indonesia
Expatriate footballers in Indonesia
Brazilian expatriate sportspeople in Greece
Expatriate footballers in Greece